Janette Parris (born 1962 in West Ham, East London) is an English contemporary artist who lives and works in London.

Early life and education
Janette Parris was awarded her master's degree in Fine Art at Goldsmiths College in 1994.

Career
Parris typically uses drawing to create strongly narrative work, often in the form of comic strips with a droll satirical humour, or figures that seem like comic-book characters. Her work has been exhibited across the UK.

Her 1998 installation Copyright, using a number of videos and items of Habitat furniture, portrayed everyday tragedies, described by The Independent as "absurd, sad, funny - and too close to home for comfort."

In 2003, she was commissioned to produce a series of works for the "Art on the Underground" programme by London Underground. In 2010, Parris's animated video Talent was shown at Tate Britain's Rude Britannia exhibition.

In 2016, she showed her work at Peckham Platform. The work for this exhibition was developed throughout 2015 and depicted the stories she encountered whilst conversing with local residents, traders and students within Peckham's town centre. 

In 2021, she had a solo exhibition, "A View without the Bridge: Janette Parris" at the Focal Point Gallery in Southend-on-Sea, Essex.

In 2023, her work was included in the "Poor Things" exhibition in the Fruitmarket Gallery in Edinburgh

Notes

External links
 Janette Parris's online comic, Arch
 Janette Parris at Iniva
 Janette Parris on ArtFacts.Net
 "The Best of Janette Parris" edited by Richard Hylton, with essay by Patricia Ellis, (2002) Autograph ABP  at the Cornerhouse website

1963 births
Living people
20th-century English women artists
21st-century English women artists
Alumni of Goldsmiths, University of London
Artists from London
Black British artists
British video artists
Women video artists
English contemporary artists
English installation artists
People from East Ham